The Transport (Wales) Act 2006 (c 5) is an Act of the Parliament of the United Kingdom. It was passed in response to a resolution approved by the National Assembly for Wales on 17 March 2004.

Section 12 - Commencement
The Transport (Wales) Act 2006 (Commencement) Order 2006 (S.I. 2006/1403 (W.140) (C.48)) was made under this section.

References
Halsbury's Statutes

External links
The Transport (Wales) Act 2006, as amended from the National Archives.
The Transport (Wales) Act 2006, as originally enacted from the National Archives.
Explanatory notes to the Transport (Wales) Act 2006.

United Kingdom Acts of Parliament 2006
Acts of the Parliament of the United Kingdom concerning Wales
2006 in Wales
History of transport in the United Kingdom
2006 in transport
Transport legislation